HMS Bluebell was an  minesweeping sloop of the Royal Navy launched on 24 July 1915.

The merchant vessel  (masquerading under the name Aud) was intercepted by Bluebell as she carried arms to Ireland for the Easter Rising in 1916.

Fate
She was sold in May 1930.

References

Bibliography

 

Acacia-class sloops
Ships built on the River Clyde
1915 ships